JAL or Jal may refer to:

Entertainment
 Jal (band), a Pakistani pop/rock band
 Jal (film), a 2014 Hindi film
 Jal Fazer, a character in the British TV series Skins
 "Jal", an episode of the British TV series Skins

Places
 Jal, New Mexico, a town in New Mexico, U.S.
 Jalisco, México
 Jal-e Akhund Mahalleh, Iran
 Jal-e Chala Sar, Iran
 Jal, Oman

Other uses
 Japan Airlines, ICAO airline designator, and abbreviation: JAL
 JAL (compiler), Just Another Language, a compiler for the PIC microcontroller
 Cyclone Jal, a storm that hit South India during November 2010
 El Lencero Airport in Xalapa, Veracruz, Mexico (IATA code: JAL)